Zsolt Loránt Szilágyi (born 29 June 1981) is a former Romanian footballer, who spent his entire career at Universitatea Cluj. He was a fan favorite at Şepcile Rosii for fidelity proven in time, being nicknamed Unicul căpitan.

On 3 September 2005, during a Cupa României match against Unirea Dej, he left the pitch after an injury that would keep him off his career for 3 years. He was operated on his left knee, where he had severe ligament issues, multiple times.

Honours
Universitatea Cluj
Liga II: 2006–07
Divizia C: 2000–01

See also 
 List of one-club men in association football

References

External links

1981 births
Living people
Romanian footballers
Association football defenders
FC Universitatea Cluj players
Liga I players
Liga II players
Liga III players
FC Universitatea Cluj managers
Romanian football managers
Romanian sportspeople of Hungarian descent
Sportspeople from Cluj-Napoca